Juan John van der Mescht (born ) is a South African rugby union player for the  in Super Rugby and in the Currie Cup and the  in the Rugby Challenge. His regular position is lock or flanker.

References

External links
 

South African rugby union players
Living people
1999 births
Rugby union players from Pretoria
Rugby union locks
Rugby union flankers
Sharks (Currie Cup) players
Sharks (rugby union) players
Stade Français players